Männikkö is a Finnish surname. Notable people with the surname include:

Miikka Männikkö (born 1979), Finnish ice hockey forward
Veikko Männikkö (1921–2012), Finnish wrestler

Finnish-language surnames